Dundas & Wilson LLP was a commercial UK law firm with offices in Edinburgh, Glasgow, London and Aberdeen.

In May 2014 Dundas and Wilson merged with CMS Cameron McKenna.

In 2012 the firm was ranked in the Top 30 Firms in Europe for Innovation by the Financial Times.

Expertise

The independent legal directory Legal 500 ranked Dundas & Wilson as a Tier 1 firm in 2012 in the following areas:

Banking & Finance
Construction
Corporate & Commercial
Commercial Litigation
Commercial Property (Scotland)
Education
Employment
Energy (Excluding Oil & Gas)
Insolvency & Corporate Recovery
Intellectual Property
IT & Telecoms
Local Government
Pensions
Planning
Professional Negligence
Projects
Transport
Unit Trusts, OEICs and investment trusts

History

Dundas & Wilson traces its roots to 1759 when David Erskine founded his own legal practice in Edinburgh.  Sir James Dundas of Ochtertyre Clerk to the Signet subsequently joined the practice and, after the death of David Erskine, William Wilson joined the partnership to form Dundas & Wilson.  From at least 1841 the firm had offices at 16 Charlotte Square, Edinburgh.  The firm remained at the Square until 1991.

The firm was active in Scotland during the 19th century as can be seen from the numerous references to the firm in Court of Session reports or old Sasine titles.

Dundas & Wilson became a limited liability partnership in 2004.

In May 2014 Dundas and Wilson combined with CMS.

References

External links
 Dundas & Wilson - Firm's official site

Law firms of the United Kingdom
Law firms of Scotland
Companies based in Edinburgh
1759 establishments in Scotland
Law firms established in 1759
2014 disestablishments in the United Kingdom
Law firms disestablished in 2014
British companies established in 1759